873 is a year, 873 AD. 873 may also refer to:

 873 (number)
 873, an area code for western regions of the Canadian province of Quebec